is a private junior college in Kyoto, Kyoto, Japan, established in 1993. The predecessor of the school was founded in 1907.

External links
 Official website 

Japanese junior colleges
Educational institutions established in 1907
Private universities and colleges in Japan
Universities and colleges in Kyoto Prefecture
1907 establishments in Japan